Iván González López (born 15 February 1988) is a Spanish former professional footballer who played mainly as a central defender.

Club career

Málaga
Born in Torremolinos, Province of Málaga, González finished his football grooming with local Málaga CF, and made his first-team – and La Liga – debut on 22 November 2009, at home against Real Zaragoza, making an immediate impact as he rescued the Andalusians from defeat by scoring with his head in the 74th minute, in a 1–1 draw.

From then onwards, González became a defensive mainstay in Juan Ramón López Muñiz's side, soon attracting interest from the likes of Real Madrid, Atlético Madrid, Liverpool and Hull City.

Castilla
After the arrival of manager Manuel Pellegrini, González appeared more as a defensive midfielder than in his natural position, but was also deemed surplus to requirements in December 2010 alongside five other players – he eventually stayed at the club. However, on 28 January 2011, he was loaned to Real Madrid Castilla of Segunda División B for the rest of the season and the following, making his official debut on 6 February in a 2–0 win at Pontevedra CF.

On 11 September 2011, in a match against Coruxo FC, Iván scored his first goal for Castilla, also being sent off in the 1–1 away draw. He again received his marching orders on 16 October, now in a 0–1 away loss to Rayo Vallecano B.

González returned to Málaga after his loan stint, but his remaining one-year contract was terminated and again signed with Castilla.

Erzgebirge Aue
On 20 September 2013, González joined German 2. Bundesliga club FC Erzgebirge Aue, signing a two-year deal and being given the number 32 shirt. On 30 September 2014, his contract was terminated by mutual consent.

Later years
González moved clubs and countries again in February 2015, signing with ASA Târgu Mureș in Romania. In late June 2016 he agreed to a two-year contract at AD Alcorcón, but left the following 4 January by mutual consent.

On 11 January 2017, González switched to the Ekstraklasa with Wisła Kraków. On 8 August, he scored twice through penalties to help the hosts defeat Wisła Płock 2–1 in the round of 32 of the Polish Cup; in May 2018, it was announced he would be leaving at the end of the next month.

On 17 July 2018, González joined Recreativo de Huelva. In May 2020, he announced his retirement from playing at the age of 32 due to injury problems.

International career
On 6 August 2010, González received a call-up by coach Luis Milla in the Spain U21 team, for the 2011 UEFA European Championship qualifier against Finland. Four months earlier, he had already been summoned by the previous manager Juan Ramón López Caro, but eventually did not make his debut.

Honours

Club
Real Madrid Castilla
Segunda División B: 2011–12

References

External links

1988 births
Living people
People from Torremolinos
Sportspeople from the Province of Málaga
Spanish footballers
Footballers from Andalusia
Association football defenders
La Liga players
Segunda División players
Segunda División B players
Tercera División players
Atlético Malagueño players
Málaga CF players
Real Madrid Castilla footballers
AD Alcorcón footballers
Recreativo de Huelva players
2. Bundesliga players
FC Erzgebirge Aue players
Liga I players
ASA 2013 Târgu Mureș players
Ekstraklasa players
Wisła Kraków players
Spanish expatriate footballers
Expatriate footballers in Germany
Expatriate footballers in Romania
Expatriate footballers in Poland
Spanish expatriate sportspeople in Germany
Spanish expatriate sportspeople in Romania
Spanish expatriate sportspeople in Poland